Styposis clausis is a species of comb-footed spider in the family Theridiidae. It is found in the USA to Panama.

References

Theridiidae
Spiders described in 1960